Mono County is a county located in the east central portion of the U.S. state of California. As of the 2020 census, the population was 13,195, making it the fourth-least populous county in California. The county seat is Bridgeport. The county is located east of the Sierra Nevada between Yosemite National Park and Nevada. The only incorporated town in the county is Mammoth Lakes, which is located at the foot of Mammoth Mountain.  Other locations, such as June Lake, are also famous as skiing and fishing resorts.  Located in the middle of the county is Mono Lake, a vital habitat for millions of migratory and nesting birds.  The lake is located in a wild natural setting, with pinnacles of tufa arising out of the salty and alkaline lake. Also located in Mono County is Bodie, the official state gold rush ghost town, which is now a California State Historic Park.

History

Mono County was formed in 1861 from parts of Calaveras, Fresno and Mariposa counties. A portion of northern Mono County contributed to the formation of Alpine County in 1864; parts of the county's territory were given to Inyo County in 1866.

The county is named after Mono Lake which, in 1852, was named for a Native American Paiute tribe, the Mono people, who historically inhabited the Sierra Nevada from north of Mono Lake to Owens Lake. The tribe's western neighbors, the Yokuts, called them monachie, meaning "fly people" because they used fly larvae as their chief food staple and trading article.

Archeologists know almost nothing about the first inhabitants of the county, as little material evidence has been found from them. The Kuzedika, a band of Paiute, had been there many generations by the time the first anglophones arrived. The Kuzedika were hunter-gatherers and their language is a part of the Shoshone language.

Geography

The highest point in Mono County is White Mountain Peak which, at 14,252 feet (4344.0 m), is the third-highest peak in California.

Adjacent counties

 Inyo County - south
 Fresno County - southwest
 Madera County - southwest
 Tuolumne County- west
 Alpine County - northwest
 Douglas County, Nevada - north
 Lyon County, Nevada - northeast
 Mineral County, Nevada - east
 Esmeralda County, Nevada - southeast

National protected areas
 Inyo National Forest (part)
 Humboldt–Toiyabe National Forest (part)
 Granite Mountain Wilderness (California)

Demographics

2021 
In June 2021, U.S. News & World Report ranked the county with the third best life expectancy in the United States at 96.5 years old.

2020 census

Note: the US Census treats Hispanic/Latino as an ethnic category. This table excludes Latinos from the racial categories and assigns them to a separate category. Hispanics/Latinos can be of any race.

2011

Places by population, race, and income

2010 Census
The 2010 United States Census reported that Mono County had a population of 14,202. The racial makeup of Mono County was 11,697 (82.4%) White, 47 (0.3%) African American, 302 (2.1%) Native American, 192 (1.4%) Asian, 11 (0.1%) Pacific Islander, 1,539 (10.8%) from other races, and 414 (2.9%) from two or more races.  Hispanic or Latino of any race were 3,762 persons (26.5%).

2000

As of the census of 2000, there were 12,853 people, 5,137 households, and 3,143 families residing in the county. The racial makeup of the county was 84.2% White, 0.5% Black or African American, 2.4% Native American, 1.1% Asian, 0.1% Pacific Islander, 9.5% from other races, and 2.3% from two or more races.  17.7% of the population were Hispanic or Latino of any race. 13.4% were of German, 12.6% Irish and 11.4% English ancestry according to Census 2000. 84.0% spoke English and 15.1% Spanish as their first language.

There were 5,137 households, out of which 28.7% had children under the age of 18 living with them, 50.6% were married couples living together, 6.5% had a female householder with no husband present, and 38.8% were non-families. 26.6% of all households were made up of individuals, and 4.3% had someone living alone who was 65 years of age or older.  The average household size was 2.43 and the average family size was 2.98.

In the county, the population was spread out, with 23.0% under the age of 18, 10.3% from 18 to 24, 33.4% from 25 to 44, 25.6% from 45 to 64, and 7.6% who were 65 years of age or older.  The median age was 36 years. For every 100 females there were 121.8 males.  For every 100 females age 18 and over, there were 126.8 males.

The median income for a household in the county was $44,992, and the median income for a family was $50,487. Males had a median income of $32,600 versus $26,227 for females. The per capita income for the county was $23,422.  About 6.3% of families and 11.5% of the population were below the poverty line, including 12.2% of those under age 18 and 1.9% of those age 65 or over.

Politics

Voter registration

Cities by population and voter registration

Overview 
In November 2008, Mono County was one of just three counties in California's interior in which voters rejected Proposition 8 which sought to ban gay marriage. The county's voters rejected Proposition 8 by 55.5 percent to 44.5 percent. The other interior counties in which Proposition 8 failed to receive a majority of votes were neighboring Alpine County and Yolo County.

In the state legislature Mono is in the 5th Assembly district, which is held by Republican Frank Bigelow, and the 8th Senate district, which is held by Republican Tom Berryhill.

Crime 

The following table includes the number of incidents reported and the rate per 1,000 persons for each type of offense.

Cities by population and crime rates

Transportation

Major highways
 U.S. Route 6
 U.S. Route 395
 State Route 89
 State Route 108
 State Route 120
 State Route 158
 State Route 167
 State Route 168
 State Route 182
 State Route 203
 State Route 266
 State Route 270

Public transportation
Eastern Sierra Transit Authority operates intercity bus service along U.S. 395, as well as local services in Mammoth Lakes. Service extends south to Lancaster, California (Los Angeles County) and north to Reno, Nevada.

Yosemite Area Regional Transit System (YARTS) also runs along U.S. 395 from Mammoth Lakes to Lee Vining before entering Yosemite National Park.

Airports
General aviation airports in Mono County include Bryant Field near Bridgeport, Mammoth Yosemite Airport and Lee Vining Airport. In December 2021, seasonal commercial air service by United Airlines to San Francisco, Los Angeles, and Denver began at the Eastern Sierra Regional Airport in Bishop, providing local service to southern Mono County.

Communities

Town
Mammoth Lakes

Census-designated places

Aspen Springs
Benton
Bridgeport (county seat)
Chalfant
Coleville
Crowley Lake
June Lake
Lee Vining
McGee Creek
Mono City
Paradise
Sunny Slopes
Swall Meadows
Topaz
Twin Lakes
Virginia Lakes
Walker

Population ranking

The population ranking of the following table is based on the 2010 census of Mono County.

† county seat

See also 
List of school districts in Mono County, California
National Register of Historic Places listings in Mono County, California

Notes

References

Further reading

External links

Mono County Film and Tourism Commission

 

 
California counties
California placenames of Native American origin
Sierra Nevada (United States)
1861 establishments in California
Populated places established in 1861